This is an incomplete list of Statutory Rules of Northern Ireland in 1999.

1-100

 Potatoes Originating in the Netherlands (Notification) Regulations (Northern Ireland) 1999 (S.R. 1999 No. 1)
 Social Security (Categorisation of Earners) (Amendment) Regulations (Northern Ireland) 1999 (S.R. 1999 No. 2)
 Protection of Water Against Agricultural Nitrate Pollution (Amendment) Regulations (Northern Ireland) 1999 (S.R. 1999 No. 3)
 Gaming (Variation of Monetary Limits) Order (Northern Ireland) 1999 (S.R. 1999 No. 4)
 Gaming (Bingo (Amendment) and Gaming Machine (Registered Clubs)) Regulations (Northern Ireland) 1999 (S.R. 1999 No. 5)
 Magistrates' Courts (Amendment) Rules (Northern Ireland) 1999 (S.R. 1999 No. 6)
 Magistrates' Courts (Criminal Justice (Children)) Rules (Northern Ireland) 1999 (S.R. 1999 No. 7)
 Motor Vehicles (Construction and Use) (Amendment) Regulations (Northern Ireland) 1999 (S.R. 1999 No. 9)
 Education (Certified Contracts) Regulations (Northern Ireland) 1999 (S.R. 1999 No. 10)
 Health and Personal Social Services (Northern Ireland) Order 1972 (Amendment) Order (Northern Ireland) 1999 (S.R. 1999 No. 11)
 Fisheries (Amendment) Byelaws (Northern Ireland) 1999 (S.R. 1999 No. 12)
 Confined Spaces Regulations (Northern Ireland) 1999 (S.R. 1999 No. 13)
 Genetically Modified Organisms (Contained Used) (Amendment) Regulations (Northern Ireland) 1999 (S.R. 1999 No. 14)
 Health Services (Tribunal and Disciplinary Procedures) (Amendment) Regulations (Northern Ireland) 1999 (S.R. 1999 No. 15)
 Health Services (Pilot Schemes: Travelling Expenses and Remission of Charges) Regulations (Northern Ireland) 1999 (S.R. 1999 No. 16)
 Health Services (Pilot Schemes: Dental Charges) Regulations (Northern Ireland) 1999 (S.R. 1999 No. 17)
 Rules of the Supreme Court (Northern Ireland) (Amendment) 1999 (S.R. 1999 No. 19)
 Registered Rents (Increase) Order (Northern Ireland) 1999 (S.R. 1999 No. 20)
 Wills and Administration Proceedings (1994 Order) (Commencement No. 2) Order (Northern Ireland) 1999 (S.R. 1999 No. 21)
 Plant Health (Amendment) Order (Northern Ireland) 1999 (S.R. 1999 No. 24)
 Criminal Justice (Children) (1998 Order) (Commencement No. 2) Order (Northern Ireland) 1999 (S.R. 1999 No. 25)
 Industrial Pollution Control (Prescribed Processes and Substances) (Amendment) Regulations (Northern Ireland) 1999 (S.R. 1999 No. 26)
 Street Works (1995 Order) (Commencement No. 4) Order (Northern Ireland) 1999 (S.R. 1999 No. 27)
 Juvenile Justice Centre Rules (Northern Ireland) 1999 (S.R. 1999 No. 28)
 Scheme for Construction Contracts in Northern Ireland Regulations (Northern Ireland) 1999 (S.R. 1999 No. 32)
 Construction Contracts Exclusion Order (Northern Ireland) 1999 (S.R. 1999 No. 33)
 Construction Contracts (1997 Order) (Commencement) Order (Northern Ireland) 1999 (S.R. 1999 No. 34)
 Income Support (General) (Standard Interest Rate Amendment) Regulations (Northern Ireland) 1999 (S.R. 1999 No. 35)
 Control of Substances Hazardous to Health (Amendment) Regulations (Northern Ireland) 1999 (S.R. 1999 No. 36)
 Taxis (Coleraine, Portstewart and Portrush) Bye-Laws (Northern Ireland) 1999 (S.R. 1999 No. 40)
 Taxis (Ballymoney) Bye-Laws (Northern Ireland) 1999 (S.R. 1999 No. 41)
 Child Benefit (Residence and Persons Abroad) (Amendment) Regulations (Northern Ireland) 1999 (S.R. 1999 No. 42)
 Foyle Area (Licensing of Fishing Engines) (Amendment) Regulations 1999 (S.R. 1999 No. 45)
 Deseasonalisation Premium (Protection of Payments) (Amendment) Regulations (Northern Ireland) 1999 (S.R. 1999 No. 46)
 Police (1998 Act) (Commencement No. 2) Order (Northern Ireland) 1999 (S.R. 1999 No. 48)
 Guaranteed Minimum Pensions Increase Order (Northern Ireland) 1999 (S.R. 1999 No. 49)
 Social Security Benefits Up-rating Order (Northern Ireland) 1999 (S.R. 1999 No. 50)
 Social Security (Contributions) (Re-rating and Northern Ireland National Insurance Fund Payments) Order (Northern Ireland) 1999 (S.R. 1999 No. 51)
 Employers's Contributions Re-imbursement (Amendment) Regulations (Northern Ireland) 1999 (S.R. 1999 No. 52)
 Family Homes and Domestic Violence (1998 Order) (Commencement No. 1) Order (Northern Ireland) 1999 (S.R. 1999 No. 56)
 Plant Protection Products (Amendment) Regulations (Northern Ireland) 1999 (S.R. 1999 No. 57)
 Rates (Amendment) (1998 Order) (Commencement No. 1) Order (Northern Ireland) 1999 (S.R. 1999 No. 58)
 Marketing and Use of Dangerous Substances Regulations (Northern Ireland) 1999 (S.R. 1999 No. 59)
 Health and Personal Social Services (Fund-holding Practices) (Amendment) Regulations (Northern Ireland) 1999 (S.R. 1999 No. 60)
 Family Homes and Domestic Violence (Allocation of Proceedings) Order (Northern Ireland) 1999 (S.R. 1999 No. 61)
 Magistrates' Courts (Domestic Proceedings) (Amendment) Rules (Northern Ireland) 1999 (S.R. 1999 No. 62)
 Magistrates' Courts (Children (Northern Ireland) Order 1995) (Amendment) Rules (Northern Ireland) 1999 (S.R. 1999 No. 63)
 Social Security (Contributions) (Re-rating) Consequential Amendment Regulations (Northern Ireland) 1999 (S.R. 1999 No. 64)
 Statutory Maternity Pay (Compensation of Employers) (Amendment) Regulations (Northern Ireland) 1999 (S.R. 1999 No. 65)
 Hill Livestock (Compensatory Allowances) (Amendment) Regulations (Northern Ireland) 1999 (S.R. 1999 No. 68)
 Lough Neagh (Levels) Scheme (Confirmation) Order (Northern Ireland) 1999 (S.R. 1999 No. 69)
 Income Support (General) (Standard Interest Rate Amendment No. 2) Regulations (Northern Ireland) 1999 (S.R. 1999 No. 70)
 Health Services (Primary Care) (1997 Order) (Commencement No. 3) Order (Northern Ireland) 1999 (S.R. 1999 No. 71)
 Social Security (1998 Order) (Commencement No. 3) Order (Northern Ireland) 1999 (S.R. 1999 No. 72)
 Planning (Environmental Impact Assessment) Regulations (Northern Ireland) 1999 (S.R. 1999 No. 73)
 Motor Vehicles (Driving Licences) (Amendment) Regulations (Northern Ireland) 1999 (S.R. 1999 No. 77)
 Motor Vehicle Testing (Amendment) (Fees) Regulations (Northern Ireland) 1999 (S.R. 1999 No. 78)
 Goods Vehicles (Testing) (Amendment) (Fees) Regulations (Northern Ireland) 1999 (S.R. 1999 No. 79)
 Fair Employment and Treatment (1998 Order) (Commencement No. 1) Order (Northern Ireland) 1999 (S.R. 1999 No. 81)
 Fair Employment and Treatment (1998 Order) (Saving and Transitional Provisions) Order (Northern Ireland) 1999 (S.R. 1999 No. 82)
 Food Safety (Fishery Products and Live Shellfish) (Hygiene) (Amendment) Regulations (Northern Ireland) 1999 (S.R. 1999 No. 83)
 Weights and Measures (Quantity Marking and Abbreviations of Units) Regulations (Northern Ireland) 1999 (S.R. 1999 No. 84)
 Rates (Regional Rates) Order (Northern Ireland) 1999 (S.R. 1999 No. 86)
 Social Security Benefits Up-rating (Amendment)Order (Northern Ireland) 1999 (S.R. 1999 No. 87)
 Family Proceedings (Amendment) Rules (Northern Ireland) 1999 (S.R. 1999 No. 88)
 Roads (Environmental Impact Assessment) Regulations (Northern Ireland) 1999 (S.R. 1999 No. 89)
 Health and Safety (Enforcing Authority) Regulations (Northern Ireland) 1999 (S.R. 1999 No. 90)
 Class Sizes in Primary Schools Regulations (Northern Ireland) 1999 (S.R. 1999 No. 91)
 Family Homes and Domestic Violence (1998 Order) (Commencement No. 2) Order (Northern Ireland) 1999 (S.R. 1999 No. 92)
 Spreadable Fats (Marketing Standards) (Amendment) Regulations (Northern Ireland) 1999 (S.R. 1999 No. 93)
 Social Security (Industrial Injuries) (Dependency) (Permitted Earnings Limits) Order (Northern Ireland) 1999 (S.R. 1999 No. 94)
 Legal Advice and Assistance (Amendment) Regulations (Northern Ireland) 1999 (S.R. 1999 No. 95)
 Health and Safety at Work (1998 Order) (Commencement) Order (Northern Ireland) 1999 (S.R. 1999 No. 96)
 Sex Discrimination Code of Practice (Equal Pay) (Appointed Day) Order (Northern Ireland) 1999 (S.R. 1999 No. 98)
 Proceeds of Crime (Countries and Territories designated under the Criminal Justice Act 1988) (1998 Order) (Amendment) (Northern Ireland) Order 1999 (S.R. 1999 No. 99)
 Health Services (Pilot Schemes: Miscellaneous Provisions and Consequential Amendments) Regulations (Northern Ireland) 1999 (S.R. 1999 No. 100)

101-200

 Road Humps Regulations (Northern Ireland) 1999 (S.R. 1999 No. 101)
 Social Security (1998 Order) (Commencement No. 4) Order (Northern Ireland) 1999 (S.R. 1999 No. 102)
 Motor Vehicles (Construction and Use) (Amendment No. 2) Regulations (Northern Ireland) 1999 (S.R. 1999 No. 103)
 Motor Vehicles (Construction and Use) (Amendment No. 3) Regulations (Northern Ireland) 1999 (S.R. 1999 No. 104)
 Dental Charges (Amendment) Regulations (Northern Ireland) 1999 (S.R. 1999 No. 105)
 Occupational and Personal Pension Schemes (Levy) (Amendment) Regulations (Northern Ireland) 1999 (S.R. 1999 No. 106)
 Social Security (Miscellaneous Amendments) Regulations (Northern Ireland) 1999 (S.R. 1999 No. 107)
 Superannuation (Planning Appeals Commission) Order (Northern Ireland) 1999 (S.R. 1999 No. 108)
 Pensions Increase (Review) Order (Northern Ireland) 1999 (S.R. 1999 No. 109)
 Specified Diseases (Notification and Movement Restrictions) (Amendment) Order (Northern Ireland) 1999 (S.R. 1999 No. 110)
 Optical Charges and Payments (Amendment) Regulations (Northern Ireland) 1999 (S.R. 1999 No. 111)
 General Ophthalmic Services (Amendment) Regulations (Northern Ireland) 1999 (S.R. 1999 No. 112)
 Workmen's Compensation (Supplementation) (Amendment) Regulations (Northern Ireland) 1999 (S.R. 1999 No. 113)
 Pesticides (Maximum Residue Levels in Crops, Food and Feeding Stuffs) (EEC Limits) (Amendment) Regulations (Northern Ireland) 1999 (S.R. 1999 No. 114)
 Producer Responsibility Obligations (Packaging waste) Regulations (Northern Ireland) 1999 (S.R. 1999 No. 115)
 Horse Passports Regulations (Northern Ireland) 1999 (S.R. 1999 No. 116)
 Social Security (Contributions), Statutory Maternity Pay and Statutory Sick Pay (Miscellaneous Amendments) Regulations (Northern Ireland) 1999 (S.R. 1999 No. 117)
 Social Security (Contributions and Credits) (Miscellaneous Amendments) Regulations (Northern Ireland) 1999 (S.R. 1999 No. 118)
 Social Security (Contributions) (Amendment) Regulations (Northern Ireland) 1999 (S.R. 1999 No. 119)
 Arable Area Payments (Amendment) Regulations (Northern Ireland) 1999 (S.R. 1999 No. 120)
 Traffic Signs (Temporary Obstructions) Regulations (Northern Ireland) 1999 (S.R. 1999 No. 121)
 Construction Plant and Equipment (Noise Emission) (Amendment) Regulations (Northern Ireland) 1999 (S.R. 1999 No. 123)
 Electrical Equipment for Explosive Atmospheres (Certification) (Amendment) Regulations (Northern Ireland) 1999 (S.R. 1999 No. 124)
 Equipment and Protective Systems Intended for Use in Potentially Explosive Atmospheres (Amendment) Regulations (Northern Ireland) 1999 (S.R. 1999 No. 125)
 Pressure Vessels (Verification) (Amendment) Regulations (Northern Ireland) 1999 (S.R. 1999 No. 126)
 Export of Dangerous Chemicals (Amendment) Regulations (Northern Ireland) 1999 (S.R. 1999 No. 127)
 Gas Cylinders (Pattern Approval) (Amendment) Regulations (Northern Ireland) 1999 (S.R. 1999 No. 128)
 County Court (Amendment) Rules (Northern Ireland) 1999 (S.R. 1999 No. 129)
 Legal Advice and Assistance (Financial Conditions) Regulations (Northern Ireland) 1999 (S.R. 1999 No. 130)
 Legal Advice and Assistance (Amendment) Regulations (Northern Ireland) 1999 (S.R. 1999 No. 131)
 Legal Aid (Financial Conditions) Regulations (Northern Ireland) 1999 (S.R. 1999 No. 132)
 Working Time (Amendment) Regulations (Northern Ireland) 1999 (S.R. 1999 No. 133)
 Crown Court (Amendment) Rules (Northern Ireland) 1999 (S.R. 1999 No. 134)
 Supreme Court Fees (Amendment) Order (Northern Ireland) 1999 (S.R. 1999 No. 135)
 County Court Fees (Amendment) Order (Northern Ireland) 1999 (S.R. 1999 No. 136)
 Social Security (Overlapping Benefits) (Amendment) Regulations (Northern Ireland) 1999 (S.R. 1999 No. 137)
 Social Security Benefits Up-rating and Miscellaneous Increases Regulations (Northern Ireland) 1999 (S.R. 1999 No. 138)
 Social Security Benefits Up-rating Regulations (Northern Ireland) 1999 (S.R. 1999 No. 139)
 Processed Cereal-based Foods and Baby Foods for Infants and Young Children (Amendment) Regulations (Northern Ireland) 1999 (S.R. 1999 No. 142)
 Food Labelling (Amendment) Regulations (Northern Ireland) 1999 (S.R. 1999 No. 143)
 Income Support (General) (Standard Interest Rate Amendment No. 3) Regulations (Northern Ireland) 1999 (S.R. 1999 No. 144)
 Jobseeker's Allowance (Amendment) Regulations (Northern Ireland) 1999 (S.R. 1999 No. 145)
 Protection from Harassment (1997 Order) (Commencement No. 2) Order (Northern Ireland) 1999 (S.R. 1999 No. 146)
 Fair Employment (Monitoring) Regulations (Northern Ireland) 1999 (S.R. 1999 No. 148)
 Social Security Contributions (Transfer of Functions, etc.) (1999 Order) (Commencement No. 1 and Transitional Provisions) Order (Northern Ireland) 1999 (S.R. 1999 No. 149)
 Health and Safety (Modifications) Regulations (Northern Ireland) 1999 (S.R. 1999 No. 150)
 Social Security (Contributions) (Amendment No. 2) Regulations (Northern Ireland) 1999 (S.R. 1999 No. 151)
 Child Support (Miscellaneous Amendments) Regulations (Northern Ireland) 1999 (S.R. 1999 No. 152)
 Northern Ireland Science Park Foundation Limited (Funding) Order (Northern Ireland) 1999 (S.R. 1999 No. 155)
 Action Programme For Nitrate Vulnerable Zones Regulations (Northern Ireland) 1999 (S.R. 1999 No. 156)
 Specified Risk Material (Amendment) Regulations (Northern Ireland) 1999 (S.R. 1999 No. 157)
 Social Security (New Deal Pilot) (Amendment) Regulations (Northern Ireland) 1999 (S.R. 1999 No. 158)
 Statutory Sick Pay and Statutory Maternity Pay (Decisions) Regulations (Northern Ireland) 1999 (S.R. 1999 No. 159)
 Measuring Equipment (Measures of Length) (Amendment) Regulations (Northern Ireland) 1999 (S.R. 1999 No. 160)
 Social Security Contributions, etc. (Decisions and Appeals - Transitional Modifications) Regulations (Northern Ireland) 1999 (S.R. 1999 No. 161)
 Social Security and Child Support (Decisions and Appeals) Regulations (Northern Ireland) 1999 (S.R. 1999 No. 162)
 Health and Social Services Trusts (Originating Capital Debt) Order (Northern Ireland) 1999 (S.R. 1999 No. 165)
 Charges for Drugs and Appliances and Travelling Expenses and Remission of Charges (Amendment) Regulations (Northern Ireland) 1999 (S.R. 1999 No. 166)
 Child Support (Miscellaneous Amendments No. 2) Regulations (Northern Ireland) 1999 (S.R. 1999 No. 167)
 Social Security (1998 Order) (Commencement No. 5) Order (Northern Ireland) 1999 (S.R. 1999 No. 168)
 Motor Cycles (Protective Headgear) Regulations (Northern Ireland) 1999 (S.R. 1999 No. 170)
 Social Security (Contributions) (Amendment No. 3) Regulations (Northern Ireland) 1999 (S.R. 1999 No. 171)
 Agricultural Wages (1977 Order) (Amendment) Regulations (Northern Ireland) 1999 (S.R. 1999 No. 172)
 Escape and Rescue from Mines Regulations (Northern Ireland) 1999 (S.R. 1999 No. 173)
 Police (1998 Act) (Commencement No. 3) Order (Northern Ireland) 1999 (S.R. 1999 No. 176)
 Foyle Area (Angling) Regulations 1999 (S.R. 1999 No. 182)
 Seed Potatoes (Crop Fees) Regulations (Northern Ireland) 1999 (S.R. 1999 No. 185)
 Electricity (Standards of Performance) (Amendment) Regulations 1999 (S.R. 1999 No. 186)
 Income Support (General) (Standard Interest Rate Amendment No. 4) Regulations (Northern Ireland) 1999 (S.R. 1999 No. 187)
 Pre-School Education in Schools (Admissions Criteria) (Amendment) Regulations (Northern Ireland) 1999 (S.R. 1999 No. 188)
 Miscellaneous Products of Animal Origin (Import Conditions) Regulations (Northern Ireland) 1999 (S.R. 1999 No. 189)
 Local Government (General Grant) Order (Northern Ireland) 1999 (S.R. 1999 No. 190)
 Education (Student Support) Regulations (Northern Ireland) 1999 (S.R. 1999 No. 192)
 Meat Products (Hygiene) (Amendment) Regulations (Northern Ireland) 1999 (S.R. 1999 No. 193)
 Importation of Animals (Amendment) Order (Northern Ireland) 1999 (S.R. 1999 No. 194)
 Disability Discrimination Act 1995 (Commencement No. 6) Order (Northern Ireland) 1999 (S.R. 1999 No. 196)
 Social Security (Incapacity, Earnings and Work Trials) (Pilot Schemes) Regulations (Northern Ireland) 1999 (S.R. 1999 No. 199)
 Legal Advice and Assistance (Amendment No. 2) Regulations (Northern Ireland) 1999 (S.R. 1999 No. 200)

201-300

 Commercial Agents (Council Directive) (Amendment) Regulations (Northern Ireland) 1999 (S.R. 1999 No. 201)
 Disability Discrimination (Service and Premises) Regulations (Northern Ireland) 1999 (S.R. 1999 No. 202)
 Diseases of Animals (Modification) Order (Northern Ireland) 1999 (S.R. 1999 No. 204)
 Poultry Feedingstuffs Order (Northern Ireland) 1999 (S.R. 1999 No. 205)
 Social Security Revaluation of Earnings Factors Order (Northern Ireland) 1999 (S.R. 1999 No. 207)
 Countryside Management Regulations (Northern Ireland) 1999 (S.R. 1999 No. 208)
 Potatoes Originating in Egypt (Amendment) Regulations (Northern Ireland) 1999 (S.R. 1999 No. 212)
 Sweeteners in Food (Amendment) Regulations (Northern Ireland) 1999 (S.R. 1999 No. 216)
 Pharmaceutical Society of Northern Ireland (General) (Amendment) Regulations (Northern Ireland) 1999 (S.R. 1999 No. 217)
 Local Government (Superannuation) (Amendment) Regulations (Northern Ireland) 1999 (S.R. 1999 No. 218)
 Social Security (Adjudication) (Amendment) Regulations (Northern Ireland) 1999 (S.R. 1999 No. 220)
 Social Security (Hospital In-Patients, Attendance Allowance and Disability Living Allowance) (Amendment) Regulations (Northern Ireland) 1999 (S.R. 1999 No. 221)
 Education (Assessment Arrangements for Key Stage 3) (Amendment) Order (Northern Ireland) 1999 (S.R. 1999 No. 222)
 Magistrates' Courts (Children (Northern Ireland) Order 1995) (Amendment No. 2) Rules (Northern Ireland) 1999 (S.R. 1999 No. 223)
 Magistrates' Courts (Sex Offender Orders) rules (Northern Ireland) 1999 (S.R. 1999 No. 224)
 Social Security Commissioners (Procedure) Regulations (Northern Ireland) 1999 (S.R. 1999 No. 225)
 Child Support Commissioners (Procedure) Regulations (Northern Ireland) 1999 (S.R. 1999 No. 226)
 Criminal Justice (1996 Order) (Commencement No. 3) Order (Northern Ireland) 1999 (S.R. 1999 No. 230)
 Horse Racing (Charges on Bookmakers) Order (Northern Ireland) 1999 (S.R. 1999 No. 231)
 Social Security (Overlapping Benefits) Amendment No. 2) Regulations (Northern Ireland) 1999 (S.R. 1999 No. 232)
 Legal Aid in Criminal Cases (Statement of Means) Rules (Northern Ireland) 1999 (S.R. 1999 No. 233)
 Motor Vehicle (Type Approval) (Amendment) Regulations (Northern Ireland) 1999 (S.R. 1999 No. 234)
 Motor Vehicles (Construction and Use) (Amendment No. 4) Regulations (Northern Ireland) 1999 (S.R. 1999 No. 235)
 Lands Tribunal (Salaries) Order (Northern Ireland) 1999 (S.R. 1999 No. 236)
 Organic Farming Regulations (Northern Ireland) 1999 (S.R. 1999 No. 237)
 Income Support (General) (Standard Interest Rate Amendment No. 5) Regulations (Northern Ireland) 1999 (S.R. 1999 No. 239)
 Legal Aid in Criminal Cases (Statement of Means) (Amendment) Rules (Northern Ireland) 1999 (S.R. 1999 No. 241)
 Social Security and Child Support (Decisions and Appeals) (Amendment) Regulations (Northern Ireland) 1999 (S.R. 1999 No. 242)
 Miscellaneous Food Additives (Amendment) Regulations (Northern Ireland) 1999 (S.R. 1999 No. 244)
 Education (Individual Pupils' Achievements) (Information) (Amendment) Regulations (Northern Ireland) 1999 (S.R. 1999 No. 245)
 Social Security (1998 Order) (Commencement No. 6 and Consequential and Transitional Provisions) Order (Northern Ireland) 1999 (S.R. 1999 No. 246)
 Social Security (Non-Cash Vouchers Amendments) Regulations (Northern Ireland) 1999 (S.R. 1999 No. 249)
 Electricity Order 1992 (Amendment) Regulations (Northern Ireland) 1999 (S.R. 1999 No. 250)
 Misuse of Drugs (Amendment) Regulations (Northern Ireland) 1999 (S.R. 1999 No. 251)
 Misuse of Drugs (Safe Custody) (Amendment) (Northern Ireland) Regulations 1999 (S.R. 1999 No. 252)
 Pharmaceutical Services (Amendment) Regulations (Northern Ireland) 1999 (S.R. 1999 No. 254)
 Food (Animals and Animal Products from Belgium) (Emergency Control) Order (Northern Ireland) 1999 (S.R. 1999 No. 255)
 Civil Evidence (1997 Order) (Commencement No. 1) Order (Northern Ireland) 1999 (S.R. 1999 No. 256)
 Motor Vehicles (Authorised Weight) Regulations (Northern Ireland) 1999 (S.R. 1999 No. 258)
 Motor Vehicle (Construction and Use) (Amendment No. 5) Regulations (Northern Ireland) 1999 (S.R. 1999 No. 259)
 Legal Aid in Criminal Proceedings (Costs) (Amendment) Rules (Northern Ireland) 1999 (S.R. 1999 No. 260)
 Animal Feedingstuffs from Belgium (Control) Regulations (Northern Ireland) 1999 (S.R. 1999 No. 261)
 Court Funds (Amendment) Rules (Northern Ireland) 1999 (S.R. 1999 No. 262)
 Tuberculosis Control Order (Northern Ireland) 1999 (S.R. 1999 No. 263)
 Tuberculosis (Examination and Testing) Scheme Order (Northern Ireland) 1999 (S.R. 1999 No. 264)
 Cattle Identification (Notification of Births, Deaths and Movements) Regulations (Northern Ireland) 1999 (S.R. 1999 No. 265)
 Social Security and Child Support (Decisions and Appeals) (Amendment No. 2) Regulations (Northern Ireland) 1999 (S.R. 1999 No. 267)
 Curriculum (Programmes of Study and Attainment Target in Home Economics at Key Stages 3 and 4) Order (Northern Ireland) 1999 (S.R. 1999 No. 269)
 Curriculum (Programmes of Study and Attainment Target in Technology and Design at Key Stages 3 and 4) Order (Northern Ireland) 1999 (S.R. 1999 No. 270)
 Social Security Contributions (Transfer of Functions, etc.) (1999 Order) (Commencement No. 2 and Consequential and Transitional Provisions) Order (Northern Ireland) 1999 (S.R. 1999 No. 271)
 Social Security and Child Support (Decisions and Appeals) (Amendment No. 3) Regulations (Northern Ireland) 1999 (S.R. 1999 No. 272)
 Salaries (Assembly Ombudsman and Commissioner for Complaints) Order (Northern Ireland) 1999 (S.R. 1999 No. 274)
 Social Security (Educational Maintenance allowance Amendment) Regulations (Northern Ireland) 1999 (S.R. 1999 No. 275)
 General Medical Services (Amendment) regulations (Northern Ireland) 1999 (S.R. 1999 No. 276)
 Unfair Dismissal and Statement of Reasons for Dismissal (Variation of Qualifying Period) Order (Northern Ireland) 1999 (S.R. 1999 No. 277)
 New Deal Pilot for 25 Plus (Miscellaneous Provisions) Order (Northern Ireland) 1999 (S.R. 1999 No. 278)
 Motor Vehicles (Construction and Use) (Amendment No. 6) Regulations (Northern Ireland) 1999 (S.R. 1999 No. 279)
 Plant Protection Products (Amendment) (No. 2) Regulations (Northern Ireland) 1999 (S.R. 1999 No. 282)
 Food Safety (General Food Hygiene) (Amendment) Regulations (Northern Ireland) 1999 (S.R. 1999 No. 284)
 Food Safety (Fishery Products and Live Shellfish) (Hygiene) (Amendment No. 2) Regulations (Northern Ireland) 1999 (S.R. 1999 No. 285)
 Food Labelling (Amendment No. 2) Regulations (Northern Ireland) 1999 (S.R. 1999 No. 286)
 Feeding Stuffs (Amendment) Regulations (Northern Ireland) 1999 (S.R. 1999 No. 287)
 Smoke Control Areas (Authorised Fuels) Regulations (Northern Ireland) 1999 (S.R. 1999 No. 288)
 Smoke Control Areas (Exempted Fireplaces) Regulations (Northern Ireland) 1999 (S.R. 1999 No. 289)
 Health and Personal Social Services (Superannuation) (Amendment) Regulations (Northern Ireland) 1999 (S.R. 1999 No. 293)
 Health and Personal Social Services (Superannuation) (Additional Voluntary Contributions) Regulations (Northern Ireland) 1999 (S.R. 1999 No. 294)
 Company Drivers' Hours and Recording Equipment (Exemptions and Supplementary Provisions) (Amendment) Regulations (Northern Ireland) 1999 (S.R. 1999 No. 295)
 Feeding Stuffs (Sampling and Analysis) Regulations (Northern Ireland) 1999 (S.R. 1999 No. 296)
 Motorways Traffic (Amendment) Regulations (Northern Ireland) 1999 (S.R. 1999 No. 297)
 Housing Benefit (General) (Amendment) Regulations (Northern Ireland) 1999 (S.R. 1999 No. 298)
 Food (Animals and Animal Products from Belgium) (Emergency Control) (Amendment) Order (Northern Ireland) 1999 (S.R. 1999 No. 299)
 Food (Peanuts from Egypt) (Emergency Control) Order (Northern Ireland) 1999 (S.R. 1999 No. 300)

301-400

 Natural Mineral Water, Spring Water and Bottled Drinking Water Regulations (Northern Ireland) 1999 (S.R. 1999 No. 301)
 Contaminants in Food (Amendment) Regulations (Northern Ireland) 1999 (S.R. 1999 No. 302)
 Chemicals (Hazard Information and Packaging for Supply) (Amendment) Regulations (Northern Ireland) 1999 (S.R. 1999 No. 303)
 Lifting Operations and Lifting Equipment Regulations (Northern Ireland) 1999 (S.R. 1999 No. 304)
 Provision and Use of Work Equipment Regulations (Northern Ireland) 1999 (S.R. 1999 No. 305)
 Race Relations Code of Practice (Elimination of Discrimination in Employment) (Appointed Day) Order (Northern Ireland) 1999 (S.R. 1999 No. 306)
 Animal Feedingstuffs from Belgium (Control) (Amendment) Regulations (Northern Ireland) 1999 (S.R. 1999 No. 307)
 Bovines and Bovine Products (Trade) Regulations (Northern Ireland) 1999 (S.R. 1999 No. 308)
 Occupational Pension Schemes (Investment, and Assignment, Forfeiture, Bankruptcy etc.) (Amendment) Regulations (Northern Ireland) 1999 (S.R. 1999 No. 309)
 Social Security (1998 Order) (Commencement No. 7 and Savings, Consequential and Transitional Provisions) Order (Northern Ireland) 1999 (S.R. 1999 No. 310)
 Sex Discrimination (Gender Reassignment) Regulations (Northern Ireland) 1999 (S.R. 1999 No. 311)
 Social Fund Winter Fuel Payment (Amendment) Regulations (Northern Ireland) 1999 (S.R. 1999 No. 312)
 Industrial Training Levy (Construction Industry) Order (Northern Ireland) 1999 (S.R. 1999 No. 314)
 Income Support (General) and Jobseeker's Allowance (Amendment) Regulations (Northern Ireland) 1999 (S.R. 1999 No. 315)
 Social Security (Students Amendments) Regulations (Northern Ireland) 1999 (S.R. 1999 No. 317)
 Pesticides (Maximum Residue Levels in Crops, Food and Feeding Stuffs) (National Limits) (Amendment) Regulations (Northern Ireland) 1999 (S.R. 1999 No. 320)
 Pesticides (Maximum Residue Levels in Crops, Food and Feeding Stuffs) (EEC Limits) (Amendment No. 2) Regulations (Northern Ireland) 1999 (S.R. 1999 No. 321)
 Bovine Spongiform Encephalopathy Order (Northern Ireland) 1999 (S.R. 1999 No. 322)
 Bovine Spongiform Encephalopathy (Feedingstuffs and Surveillance) Regulations (Northern Ireland) 1999 (S.R. 1999 No. 323)
 Cattle Passport Regulations (Northern Ireland) 1999 (S.R. 1999 No. 324)
 Waste and Contaminated Land (1997 Order) (Commencement No. 3) Order (Northern Ireland) 1999 (S.R. 1999 No. 325)
 Welfare of Animals (Staging Points) Regulations (Northern Ireland) 1999 (S.R. 1999 No. 326)
 Disability Discrimination Code of Practice (Goods, Facilities, Services and Premises) Order (Northern Ireland) 1999 (S.R. 1999 No. 327)
 Game Birds Preservation Order (Northern Ireland) 1999 (S.R. 1999 No. 328)
 Electricity (Standards of Performance) (Amendment No. 2) Regulations (Northern Ireland) 1999 (S.R. 1999 No. 331)
 Rules of the Supreme Court (Northern Ireland) (Amendment No. 2) 1999 (S.R. 1999 No. 333)
 County Court (Amendment No. 2) Rules (Northern Ireland) 1999 (S.R. 1999 No. 334)
 Food (Animals and Animal Products from Belgium) (Emergency Control) (No. 2) Order (Northern Ireland) 1999 (S.R. 1999 No. 335)
 Animal Feedingstuffs from Belgium (Control) (No. 2) Regulations (Northern Ireland) 1999 (S.R. 1999 No. 336)
 Education (1998 Order) (Commencement No. 2) Order (Northern Ireland) 1999 (S.R. 1999 No. 337)
 Planning Applications (Exemption from Publication) Order (Northern Ireland) 1999 (S.R. 1999 No. 338)
 Civil Evidence (1997 Order) (Commencement No. 2) Order (Northern Ireland) 1999 (S.R. 1999 No. 339)
 Social Security (Sports Awards Amendments) Regulations (Northern Ireland) 1999 (S.R. 1999 No. 342)
 Education (Student Loans) (Amendment) Regulations (Northern Ireland) 1999 (S.R. 1999 No. 343)
 Social Security (Incapacity Benefit and Jobseeker's Allowance) (Amendment) Regulations (Northern Ireland) 1999 (S.R. 1999 No. 346)
 Child Benefit (Great Britain Reciprocal Arrangements) (Amendment) Regulations (Northern Ireland) 1999 (S.R. 1999 No. 349)
 Social Security (Great Britain Reciprocal Arrangements) (Amendment) Regulations (Northern Ireland) 1999 (S.R. 1999 No. 350)
 Students Awards Regulations (Northern Ireland) 1999 (S.R. 1999 No. 351)
 Electricity (Class Exemptions from the Requirement for a Licence) Order (Northern Ireland) 1999 (S.R. 1999 No. 352)
 Local Government (Defined Activities) (Exemptions) Order (Northern Ireland) 1999 (S.R. 1999 No. 353)
 Road Traffic (Fixed Penalty) (Offences) (Amendment) Order (Northern Ireland) 1999 (S.R. 1999 No. 354)
 Fair Employment and Treatment (1998 Order) (Commencement No. 2) Order (Northern Ireland) 1999 (S.R. 1999 No. 355)
 Food (Animals and Animal Products from Belgium) (Emergency Control) (No. 3) Order (Northern Ireland) 1999 (S.R. 1999 No. 357)
 Motor Vehicles (Driving Licences) (Amendment No. 2) Regulations (Northern Ireland) 1999 (S.R. 1999 No. 358)
 Animal Feedingstuffs from Belgium (Control) (No. 3) Regulations (Northern Ireland) 1999 (S.R. 1999 No. 360)
 Controlled Waste (Registration of Carriers and Seizure of Vehicles) Regulations (Northern Ireland) 1999 (S.R. 1999 No. 362)
 Salaries (Comptroller and Auditor General) Order (Northern Ireland) 1999 (S.R. 1999 No. 364)
 Social Security (Claims and Payments) (Amendment) Regulations (Northern Ireland) 1999 (S.R. 1999 No. 365)
 Electricity (Standards of Performance) (Amendment No. 3) Regulations (Northern Ireland) 1999 (S.R. 1999 No. 366)
 Food Protection (Emergency Prohibitions) Order (Northern Ireland) 1999 (S.R. 1999 No. 368)
 Students Awards (Amendment) Regulations (Northern Ireland) 1999 (S.R. 1999 No. 369)
 Education (Student Support) (Amendment) Regulations (Northern Ireland) 1999 (S.R. 1999 No. 370)
 Social Security (1998 Order) (Commencement No. 8 and Savings, Consequential and Transitional Provisions) Order (Northern Ireland) 1999 (S.R. 1999 No. 371)
 Housing Benefit (General) (Amendment No. 2) Regulations (Northern Ireland) 1999 (S.R. 1999 No. 372)
 Waste and Contaminated Land (1997 Order) (Commencement No. 4) Order (Northern Ireland) 1999 (S.R. 1999 No. 373)
 Occupational Pension Schemes (Preservation of Benefit) (Amendment) Regulations (Northern Ireland) 1999 (S.R. 1999 No. 378)
 Seeds (Fees) Regulations (Northern Ireland) 1999 (S.R. 1999 No. 379)
 Welfare of Animals (Transport) (Amendment) Order (Northern Ireland) 1999 (S.R. 1999 No. 380)
 Social Security (Miscellaneous Amendments No. 2) Regulations (Northern Ireland) 1999 (S.R. 1999 No. 381)
 Social Security (Personal Allowances for Children and Young Persons Amendment) Regulations (Northern Ireland) 1999 (S.R. 1999 No. 382)
 Spreadable Fats (Marketing Standards) Regulations (Northern Ireland) 1999 (S.R. 1999 No. 383)
 Registration of Clubs (Accounts) (Amendment) Regulations (Northern Ireland) 1999 (S.R. 1999 No. 384)
 Social Security and Child Support (Tax Credits Consequential Amendments) Regulations (Northern Ireland) 1999 (S.R. 1999 No. 385)
 Food Protection (Emergency Prohibitions) (Strangford Lough) Order (Northern Ireland) 1999 (S.R. 1999 No. 386)
 Housing Renovation etc. Grants (Reduction of Grant) (Amendment) Regulations (Northern Ireland) 1999 (S.R. 1999 No. 387)
 Plant Health (Wood and Bark) (Amendment) Order (Northern Ireland) 1999 (S.R. 1999 No. 389)
 Income Support (General) (Amendment) Regulations (Northern Ireland) 1999 (S.R. 1999 No. 390)
 Social Security (Notional Income and Capital Amendment) Regulations (Northern Ireland) 1999 (S.R. 1999 No. 391)
 Explosives (Fireworks) Regulations (Northern Ireland) 1999 (S.R. 1999 No. 392)
 Optical Charges and Payments and General Ophthalmic Services (Amendment) Regulations (Northern Ireland) 1999 (S.R. 1999 No. 394)
 Travelling Expenses and Remission of Charges (Amendment) Regulations (Northern Ireland) 1999 (S.R. 1999 No. 395)
 Welfare Foods (Amendment) Regulations (Northern Ireland) 1999 (S.R. 1999 No. 397)
 Public Interest Disclosure (1998 Order) (Commencement) Order (Northern Ireland) 1999 (S.R. 1999 No. 400)

401-500

 Public Interest Disclosure (Prescribed Persons) Order (Northern Ireland) 1999 (S.R. 1999 No. 401)
 Public Interest Disclosure (Compensation) Regulations (Northern Ireland) 1999 (S.R. 1999 No. 402)
 Food Protection (Emergency Prohibitions) (No. 2) Order (Northern Ireland) 1999 (S.R. 1999 No. 403)
 Disability Discrimination Code of Practice (Duties of Trade Organisations to their Disabled Members and Applicants) (Appointed Day) Order (Northern Ireland) 1999 (S.R. 1999 No. 404)
 Pharmaceutical Services (Amendment No. 2) Regulations (Northern Ireland) 1999 (S.R. 1999 No. 405)
 Social Security (1998 Order) (Commencement No. 9 and Transitional Provisions) Order (Northern Ireland) 1999 (S.R. 1999 No. 407)
 Social Security and Child Support (Decisions and Appeals) and Jobseeker's Allowance (Amendment) Regulations (Northern Ireland) 1999 (S.R. 1999 No. 408)
 Redundancy Payments (Continuity of Employment in Local Government, etc.) (Modification) Order (Northern Ireland) 1999 (S.R. 1999 No. 409)
 Road Traffic (Traffic Wardens) Order (Northern Ireland) 1999 (S.R. 1999 No. 410)
 Royal Ulster Constabulary Reserve (Full-time) (Appointment and Conditions of Service) (Amendment) Regulations 1999 (S.R. 1999 No. 411)
 Royal Ulster Constabulary (Amendment) Regulations 1999 (S.R. 1999 No. 412)
 Health and Social Services Trusts (Originating Capital Debt) (Amendment) Order (Northern Ireland) 1999 (S.R. 1999 No. 414)
 Environmental Impact Assessment (Fish Farming in Marine Waters) Regulations (Northern Ireland) 1999 (S.R. 1999 No. 415)
 Housing Benefit (General) (Amendment No. 3) Regulations (Northern Ireland) 1999 (S.R. 1999 No. 416)
 Animal By-Products (Identification) Regulations (Northern Ireland) 1999 (S.R. 1999 No. 418)
 Pre-School Education in Schools (Admissions Criteria) Regulations (Northern Ireland) 1999 (S.R. 1999 No. 419)
 Food (Animals and Animal Products from Belgium) (Emergency Control) (No. 4) Order (Northern Ireland) 1999 (S.R. 1999 No. 420)
 Animal Feedingstuffs from Belgium (Control) (No. 4) Regulations (Northern Ireland) 1999 (S.R. 1999 No. 422)
 Mussels (Prohibition of Fishing) Regulations (Northern Ireland) 1999 (S.R. 1999 No. 423)
 Change of District Name (Dungannon) Order (Northern Ireland) 1999 (S.R. 1999 No. 426)
 Social Security (1998 Order) (Commencement No. 10 and Savings, Consequential and Transitional Provisions) Order (Northern Ireland) 1999 (S.R. 1999 No. 428)
 Specified Risk Material (Inspection Charges) Regulations (Northern Ireland) 1999 (S.R. 1999 No. 431)
 Collective Redundancies and Transfer of Undertakings (Protection of Employment) (Amendment) Regulations (Northern Ireland) 1999 (S.R. 1999 No. 432)
 Importation of Animal Pathogens Order (Northern Ireland) 1999 (S.R. 1999 No. 433)
 Specified Animal Pathogens Order (Northern Ireland) 1999 (S.R. 1999 No. 434)
 Road Traffic Offenders (Additional Offences and Prescribed Devices) Order (Northern Ireland) 1999 (S.R. 1999 No. 435)
 Superannuation (Secretary to The Mental Health Commission) Order (Northern Ireland) 1999 (S.R. 1999 No. 438)
 Education (1998 Order) (Commencement No. 3) Order (Northern Ireland) 1999 (S.R. 1999 No. 439)
 Disability Discrimination (Description of Insurance Services) Regulations (Northern Ireland) 1999 (S.R. 1999 No. 440)
 Health Services (Choice of Dental Practitioner) (Amendment) Regulations (Northern Ireland) 1999 (S.R. 1999 No. 441)
 Employer's Liability (Compulsory Insurance) Regulations (Northern Ireland) 1999 (S.R. 1999 No. 448)
 Local Government (Payments to Councillors) Regulations (Northern Ireland) 1999 (S.R. 1999 No. 449)
 Fair Employment (Specification of Public Authorities) (Amendment) Order (Northern Ireland) 1999 (S.R. 1999 No. 451)
 Fair Employment Tribunal (Rules of Procedure) (Amendment) Regulations (Northern Ireland) 1999 (S.R. 1999 No. 452)
 Motor Vehicles (Construction and Use) Regulations (Northern Ireland) 1999 (S.R. 1999 No. 454)
 Compulsory Registration of Title Order (Northern Ireland) 1999 (S.R. 1999 No. 455)
 Sheep Annual Premium (Amendment) Regulations (Northern Ireland) 1999 (S.R. 1999 No. 457)
 Property (1997 Order) (Commencement No. 2) Order (Northern Ireland) 1999 (S.R. 1999 No. 461)
 Fair Employment and Treatment (Questions and Replies) Regulations (Northern Ireland) 1999 (S.R. 1999 No. 463)
 County Court (Amendment No. 3) Rules (Northern Ireland) 1999 (S.R. 1999 No. 464)
 Jobseeker's Allowance (New Deal Amendment) Regulations (Northern Ireland) 1999 (S.R. 1999 No. 467)
 Jobseeker's Allowance (Amendment No. 2) Regulations (Northern Ireland) 1999 (S.R. 1999 No. 468)
 Occupational Pensions (Revaluation) Order (Northern Ireland) 1999 (S.R. 1999 No. 469)
 Employment Relations (1999 Order) (Commencement No. 1 and Transitional and Saving Provisions) Order (Northern Ireland) 1999 (S.R. 1999 No. 470)
 Maternity and Parental Leave etc. Regulations (Northern Ireland) 1999 (S.R. 1999 No. 471)
 Social Security (1998 Order) (Commencement No. 11 and Consequential and Transitional Provisions) Order (Northern Ireland) 1999 (S.R. 1999 No. 472)
 Social Security and Child Support (Decisions and Appeals) (Amendment No. 4) Regulations (Northern Ireland) 1999 (S.R. 1999 No. 473)
 Social Security (New Deal Pilot) Regulations (Northern Ireland) 1999 (S.R. 1999 No. 474)
 Motor Vehicles (Invalid Carriages) Regulations (Northern Ireland) 1999 (S.R. 1999 No. 478)
 Vehicles (Class 1 Invalid Carriages) Regulations (Northern Ireland) 1999 (S.R. 1999 No. 479)
 Departments (1999 Order) (Commencement) Order (Northern Ireland) 1999 (S.R. 1999 No. 480)
 Departments (Transfer and Assignment of Functions) Order (Northern Ireland) 1999 (S.R. 1999 No. 481)
 Foyle Area (Close Season) Regulations 1999 (S.R. 1999 No. 482)
 Foyle Area (Control of Fishing) Regulations 1999 (S.R. 1999 No. 483)
 Traffic Signs (Amendment) Regulations (Northern Ireland) 1999 (S.R. 1999 No. 484)
 Foyle Area (Licensing of Fishing Engines) (Amendment No. 2) Regulations 1999 (S.R. 1999 No. 485)
 Personal and Occupational Pension Schemes (Miscellaneous Amendments) Regulations (Northern Ireland) 1999 (S.R. 1999 No. 486)
 Eel Fishing (Licence Duties) Regulations (Northern Ireland) 1999 (S.R. 1999 No. 487)
 Fisheries (Amendment No. 2) Byelaws (Northern Ireland) 1999 (S.R. 1999 No. 488)
 Magistrates' Courts (Devolution Issues) Rules (Northern Ireland) 1999 (S.R. 1999 No. 489)
 County Court (Amendment No. 4) Rules (Northern Ireland) 1999 (S.R. 1999 No. 490)
 Crown Court (Amendment No. 2) Rules (Northern Ireland) 1999 (S.R. 1999 No. 491)
 Criminal Appeal (Devolution Issues) Rules (Northern Ireland) 1999 (S.R. 1999 No. 492)
 Rules of the Supreme Court (Northern Ireland) (Amendment No. 3) 1999 (S.R. 1999 No. 493)
 Welfare Reform and Pensions (1999 Order) (Commencement No. 1) Order (Northern Ireland) 1999 (S.R. 1999 No. 494)
 Beef Bones (Amendment) Regulations (Northern Ireland) 1999 (S.R. 1999 No. 495)
 Producer Responsibility Obligations (Packaging Waste) (Amendment) Regulations (Northern Ireland) 1999 (S.R. 1999 No. 496)
 Hill Livestock (Compensatory Allowances) Regulations (Northern Ireland) 1999 (S.R. 1999 No. 497)
 Countryside Access (Amendment) Regulations (Northern Ireland) 1999 (S.R. 1999 No. 498)
 Social Fund (Maternity and Funeral Expenses) (General) (Amendment) Regulations (Northern Ireland) 1999 (S.R. 1999 No. 499)
 Income Support (General) (Amendment No. 2) Regulations (Northern Ireland) 1999 (S.R. 1999 No. 500)

501-600

 Income Support (General) and Jobseeker's Allowance (Amendment No. 2) Regulations (Northern Ireland) 1999 (S.R. 1999 No. 501)
 Marketing of Ornamental Plant Propagating Material Regulations (Northern Ireland) 1999 (S.R. 1999 No. 502)

External links
  Statutory Rules (NI) List
 Draft Statutory Rules (NI) List

1999
Statutory rules
Northern Ireland Statutory Rules